The British Academy consists of world-leading scholars and researchers in the humanities and social sciences. Each year, it elects fellows to its membership. The following were elected in the 1920s.

1920
 Professor W. W. Buckland
 Professor A. F. Pollard

1921
 Professor C. F. Bastable
 Very Rev. W. R. Inge, KCVO
 Sir Aurel Stein, KCIE
 Professor James Tait

1922
 T. W. Allen
 Professor A. L. Bowley
 O. M. Dalton
 Sir W. S. Holdsworth, KC
 Professor H. H. Joachim
 Dr A. G. Little
 Professor R. A. Nicholson
 Professor A. W. Pollard, CB

1923
 Dr P. S. Allen
 Professor H. J. C. Grierson
 Professor J. L. Myres, OBE
 Dr L. C. Purser
 Dr William Crooke, CIE
 W. E. Johnson

1924
 Rev. Professor J. F. Bethune-Baker
 Professor G. Baldwin Brown
 Sir E. K. Chambers, KBE, CB
 Professor O. Elton
 Professor F. Llewellyn Griffith
 Professor H. D. Hazeltine
 Professor A. C. Pearson
 A. Hamilton Smith, CB
 Professor N. Kemp Smith
 Professor G. Baldwin Brown
 C. L. Kingsford
 Rev. Dr C. Plummer

1925
 Professor H. M. Chadwick
 Professor E. G. Gardner
 Dr T. Rice Holmes
 Professor Ellis H. Minns
 Rev. Canon B. H. Streeter
 Professor George M. Trevelyan, OM, CBE
 Professor H. W. C. Davis, CBE
 Professor L. T. Hobhouse
 Sir Richard Temple, Bt, CB, CIE

1926
 Rev. F. E. Brightman
 Dr C. D. Broad
 Dr G. P. Gooch
 Sir C. R. Peers, CBE
 Dr F. C. S. Schiller
 Professor Alexander Souter
 Sir Josiah C. Stamp, GBE
 Professor F. M. Stenton
 Sir T. W. Arnold, CIE
 Dr H. R. H. Hall
 Professor C. H. Herford

1927
 Professor J. D. Beazley
 Lord Chalmers, GCB
 Professor R. W. Chambers
 Most Rev. C. F. D'Arcy
 Dr Peter Giles
 Dr J. Rendel Harris
 Professor G. Dawes Hicks
 Professor A. C. Pigou
 Professor F. M. Powicke
 Dr W. D. Ross, OBE
 Professor E. de Sélincourt
 Professor H. W. V. Temperley, OBE
 Professor F. W. Thomas
 Professor C. C. J. Webb
 Dr Thomas Ashby

1928
 Professor J. H. Clapham, CBE
 Dr W. W. Greg
 Professor A. Pearce Higgins, CBE, KC
 Dr W. W. Tarn
 Professor A. Hamilton Thompson

1929
 Dr G. G. Coulton
 Dr Alan H. Gardiner
 J. M. Keynes, CB
 Dr C. W. Previté-Orton
 A. F. Shand
 Professor D. A. Slater 
 Marcus N. Tod, OBE
 The Marquess of Zetland, GCSI, GCIE
 Professor F. de Zulueta

See also 
 Fellows of the British Academy

References 
The names are from the list of fellows, alive and dead, in Proceedings of the British Academy, vol. xviii (1932), pp. vii–x.